One Increasing Purpose is a 1927 American silent drama film directed by Harry Beaumont and written by Bradley King. It is based on the 1925 novel One Increasing Purpose by A. S. M. Hutchinson. The film stars Edmund Lowe, Lila Lee, Holmes Herbert, May Allison, Huntley Gordon and Lawford Davidson. The film was released on January 2, 1927, by Fox Film Corporation.

Synopsis
A man returns to England having fought in the British Army during World War I. He finds both his problems are having difficulties with their marriages and sets out to help them and others.

Cast
Edmund Lowe as Slim Paris
Lila Lee as Elizabeth Glade
Holmes Herbert as Charles Paris
May Allison as Linda Travers Paris
Huntley Gordon as Andrew Paris
Lawford Davidson as Dr. Byrne
Emily Fitzroy as Mrs. Andiron
George Irving as Mr. Glade
Josef Swickard as Old Gand
Jane Novak as Alice Paris
Nicholas Soussanin as Jule
Tom Maguire as Blinky
Gwynneth Bristowe as Mrs. Yeoman
J. Fisher White as Mr. Yeoman

References

External links
 

1927 films
1920s English-language films
Silent American drama films
1927 drama films
Fox Film films
Films directed by Harry Beaumont
American silent feature films
American black-and-white films
1920s American films
Films based on British novels
Films set in England